Hag's Tooth may refer to:

Hag's Tooth, Kerry, a 650 m peak in the Macgillycuddy's Reeks range in County Kerry, Ireland
 a rocky peak in Jelovica, a karst plateau in northwestern Slovenia